Artova is a town and a district of Tokat Province in the Black Sea region of Turkey. A railway line through Artova connects the town in the north with Samsun and in the southwest with Sivas.

The town's current mayor is Lütvü Yalçın ([AKP]).

References

Artova at YerelNet

Populated places in Tokat Province
Districts of Tokat Province